At least three ships of the Imperial Russian Navy have been named Svetlana.

 , a 40-gun steam frigate built in France and sold for scrap in 1892 - see List of Russian steam frigates.
 , a French-built protected cruiser sunk during the Battle of Tsushima in 1905.
 , name ship of the  light cruisers; renamed Krasny Krym by the Soviets before she was completed. Sold for scrap in 1959.

Russian Navy ship names